The Juno Awards of 2018, honouring Canadian music achievements, were presented in Vancouver, British Columbia during the weekend of 24–25 March 2018. The primary telecast ceremonies were held at Rogers Arena. Vancouver previously hosted the Juno Awards in 1991, 1998 and 2009. Michael Bublé hosted these awards after having stepped down from his scheduled hosting the previous year due to his son's cancer diagnosis. Nominations were announced on 6 February 2018.

Changes in 2018 from previous years include the reintroduction of the Juno Award for Comedy Album of the Year, a category which has not been awarded since 1984, and the ceremony's television broadcast returning to CBC Television, after previously being broadcast by CTV.

Potential host city bids
In September 2015, the Capital Region Music Awards Society in Victoria, British Columbia announced its intention to bid for hosting the 2018 Juno Awards. Victoria made a bid to host the 2014 Junos, but that year's ceremonies were hosted in Winnipeg.

In April 2016, various groups in Edmonton were also investigating a potential bid for the 2018 Juno Awards. The city previously hosted the Junos in 2004.

In early April 2017, Vancouver was announced as the 2018 Juno Awards host after the 2017 awards concluded. On 19 April 2017, it was announced that CBC Television would take over broadcast rights to the Junos beginning in 2018, their first since 2001.

Events

Jann Arden and Bob Rock performed and hosted at the Songwriters' Circle on 25 March, prior to the main awards ceremony. The Juno Cup charity hockey game between musicians and former NHL players was held at the Bill Copeland Sports Centre in Burnaby on 23 March.

Performers
Performers for the main ceremony included Jessie Reyez, Arkells, Daniel Caesar, Lights, Arcade Fire, Dallas Green and Sarah Harmer. Canadian pop-rock band Hedley were originally part of the Juno lineup, but pulled out due to sexual harassment allegations against lead singer Jacob Hoggard On 19 February, Hedley announced that they withdrew all their nominations from the Juno Awards.

Presenters

Main Show
 Michael Bublé — Presented Arcade Fire
 Andrea Bang (from Kim's Convenience) and Mark McMorris (Canadian Olympic Snowboarder) — Presented R&B/Soul Recording of The Year
 Mélanie Joly (Canadian Heritage Minister) and Jasmyn Burke (Weaves) — Presented Breakthrough Artist of the Year
 Buffy Sainte-Marie and Grimes — Presented Lights
 Northern Touch All-Stars: Rascalz, Checkmate, Kardinal Offishall, Thrust and Choclair — Presented Rap Recording of The Year, performed the single "Northern Touch" and presented Daniel Caesar
 Kevin Drew and Pearl Wenjack — Presented Sarah Harmer and City and Colour for the Gord Downie Tribute
 Geddy Lee — Presented the Barenaked Ladies for their induction into the Canadian Music Hall of Fame
 Jann Arden and Bob Rock — Presented Album of The Year and Michael Bublé
 Michael Bublé — Presented Diana Krall
 Ruth B, Scott Helman and Charlotte Cardin — Presented Fan Choice Award
 Ria Mae and Tyler Connolly (Tyler) — Presented Artist of The Year

Source:

Nominees and winners
Barenaked Ladies are the year's inductees into the Canadian Music Hall of Fame. Former band member Steven Page joined the band and performed at the primary Juno ceremonies. They were inducted by Geddy Lee of Rush.

Denise Donlon, a former personality of MuchMusic and former president of Sony Music Canada, is the 2018 recipient of the Walt Grealis Special Achievement Award for her contributions to the Canadian music industry.

Gary Slaight is the recipient of the Humanitarian Award. He and his father founded the Slaight Family Foundation which supports music industry and artist development, healthcare and other social causes. As of this year, the Humanitarian Award is no longer named after Allan Waters. Slaight received the Walt Grealis Special Achievement Award at the 2012 Juno Awards.

People

Albums

Songs and recordings

Other

References

2018 music awards
2018
Music festivals in Vancouver
2018 in Canadian music
March 2018 events in Canada
2018 in British Columbia